Waterloo is a district in Central London, and part of the Bishops ward of the London Borough of Lambeth. The area is part of a business improvement district which includes The Cut and the Old Vic and Young Vic theatres. It includes some sections of the London Borough of Southwark.

Marsh
The area was marshland towards the northern tip of the ancient parish of Lambeth. It was known as Lambeth Marshe, but was drained in the 18th century and is remembered in the Lower Marsh street name.

Notable places

Waterloo is connected to the Strand area on the north bank of the River Thames by Waterloo Bridge. The first bridge on the site was opened in 1817 and the current bridge was opened in 1945. The bridge was named to commemorate the Battle of Waterloo in 1815. Waterloo Road also dates from this time, built on land belonging to the Archbishop of Canterbury. St John's, Waterloo was constructed from 1822 by the Commissioners for Building New Churches as the population of the parish of Lambeth had significantly increased. After the opening of Waterloo railway station in 1848 via the Nine Elms to Waterloo Viaduct the locality around the station and Lower Marsh became known as Waterloo. The boundary of the ecclesiastical parish of St John Waterloo established in 1824 was formed by the River Thames in the north and west, approximated Westminster Bridge Road in the south, and followed the boundary with Southwark in the east.

The public library in Waterloo was constructed in 1893. It remained open until the early 1960s when it was vacated due to its poor condition. The building now houses the Waterloo Action Centre.

The Catholic St Patrick's Church was built in 1897 and designed by Frederick Walters. Roupell Street is noted for its well-preserved Georgian housing and is often used as a TV and film location.

Notable people
 Evelyn Campbell (actress) (1868 – ?), stage actress
 Frankie Fraser (1923 - 2014), malefactor

References

Districts of the London Borough of Lambeth
Areas of London
Districts of London on the River Thames
Business improvement districts in London